Maartje Verhoef (born 5 September 1997) is a Dutch fashion model.

Career
Maartje Verhoef was discovered when a photographer who worked at her father's company asked her to replace a model who called in sick for a photoshoot. The photographer sent the pictures to Micha Models, which would become her mother agency.

Verhoef started her fashion career in September 2012, by opening the Prada Spring/Summer 2013 runway show in Milan, as an exclusive. She also starred in the Prada ad campaign that season, shot by Steven Meisel.

She became the top walker of the Spring/Summer 2014 season, when she walked 66 runway shows.

Verhoef has walked in runway shows for the designers Calvin Klein, Ralph Lauren, Michael Kors, Alexander Wang, Oscar de la Renta, Carolina Herrera, Tommy Hilfiger, Hugo Boss, Vera Wang, Tom Ford, DKNY, Donna Karan, Jil Sander, Fendi, Giorgio Armani, Max Mara, Dolce & Gabbana, Gucci, Versace, Balenciaga, Dior, Viktor & Rolf, Hermès, Miu Miu, Valentino, Louis Vuitton, Alexander McQueen, Balmain, and Chanel.

She has starred in ad campaigns for Prada, Giorgio Armani, Dior, Calvin Klein, Céline, Salvatore Ferragamo, Moschino, Anna Sui, Alexander McQueen, Coach, Valentino, Gucci, Louis Vuitton, and Giuseppe Zanotti.

References

1997 births
Living people
Dutch female models
Models from Amsterdam
Women Management models
Prada exclusive models